Fragaria pentaphylla is a tetraploid species of wild strawberry native to China. In Chinese, it is called the "five-leaf strawberry".

Description 
Usually 6–15 cm tall, this species usually blooms around April to May, the fruits are ripe by June. Characteristics include:
 Thick leaves with 5 leaflets (2 auxiliary leaflets and 3 terminal leaflets)
 Hemispheric fruit, sometimes white (f. alba)
 Glabrous above, sparsely hairy beneath
 Reflexed petals
 Flowers mostly in ones or in pairs- rarely in 3's.

Distribution 
Fragaria pentaphylla is native to the Chinese provinces of Sichuan Qinghai Gansu Shanxi and Henan. It is most often found on forests, forest clearings, scrub, mountain meadows, and open gravels at elevations of 1000–2700 m.

Cultivation 
This species is rare, (if at all) in cultivation.

Commercial value 
This plant has little or no commercial value. However, with chromosome doubling, this plant can be bred with Fragaria × ananassa, the garden strawberry, possibly introducing new traits, such as disease resistance or new flavors (especially f. alba) to cultivated strawberries.

References 

pentaphylla